Levič is a small village in the hills southwest of Slovenska Bistrica in northeastern Slovenia. The area is part of the traditional region of Styria. It is included with the rest of the Municipality of Slovenska Bistrica in the Drava Statistical Region.

References

External links
Levič at Geopedia

Populated places in the Municipality of Slovenska Bistrica